Coleophora canadensisella is a moth of the family Coleophoridae. It is found in North America.

The larvae feed on the leaves of Cornus canadensis. They create a composite leaf case.

References

canadensisella
Moths described in 1955
Moths of North America